Wamba Airport  is an airstrip serving the village of Kikongo Sur Wamba in Kwilu Province, Democratic Republic of the Congo. The runway lies between the village and the Wamba River.

See also

Transport in the Democratic Republic of the Congo
List of airports in the Democratic Republic of the Congo

References

External links
 OpenStreetMap - Kikongo Sur Wamba
 FallingRain - Kikongo
 Google Maps - Kikongo
 OurAirports - Kikongo
 

Airports in Kwilu Province